Exteel was a third-person shooter game published by NCSOFT, a Korean game company, and was developed by NCSOFT's . Players controlled giant vehicles called Mechanaughts ("mecha") and fought against the computer, or against other online players, in a variety of gameplay modes. The Mechanaughts were customizable. The game was free to download and play, but players could buy "NCcoins" with real money, through the NCcoin micropayment system. NCcoins could be used to purchase exclusive in-game weapons, skills, and parts.

Exteel was released on December 4, 2007. It was terminated on September 1, 2010, when all Exteel international servers were permanently shutdown. The Chinese version of Exteel was known as G7 online and was published by PlayNC, a branch of NCSOFT.

Backstory 
On June 27, 2008, the first part of Exteel'''s official back-story was posted to GameZone.com. It described a violent conflict in the distant future from a first-person point of view (with in-universe tone).

Accordingly, a group of colonists had settled on the planet of Natha on the untamed continent of Taryn, the primary setting of the game. Over the course of thirty years, as the colony grew and advanced technologically, territories were slowly drawn up. Borders were reinforced by immigrants, trying to escape the Federation, from other planets such as Mars, Jupiter, and Saturn. Given these beginnings, weapons and fighting were almost unheard of on Natha in its early existence, and were not easily resurrected. To settle these disputes, mercenaries in battle-hardened Mechanaughts were hired by the four major nations on the planet: the subterranean-dwelling Marston, the financially prosperous Palamo, the newcomer and only recently independent West Palamo, and the technologically advanced Aiers. In time, small border conflicts grew between the government houses. Marston declared war on Palamo, after a village within Marston territory was destroyed. Palamo, claiming innocence, retaliated, and thus began the conflict around which the game is centered. The unnamed narrator wonders when the fighting will end and who will win the long war for independence fought on various planets. (No mention of extraterrestrial life is made, an indication that none will appear in the game.)

Players assume the role of mercenaries fighting in endless battles across the developed continent, almost unrestrained by the governments who hired them.

 Gameplay 
Players start off with a free, cheap Mechanaught. Credits are used to purchase new parts, weapons, and skills, or secondary items such as repair points or paint and acquired through the various game modes. Some parts can only be purchased with real money via the NCcoin micropayment system. Most items in the game can be purchased using credits or NCcoins. Most items in the game can be bought for a time-limit or, for a higher price, a level of durability. If the time limit or the durability points of the item run out, then the item is lost and must be repurchased or the item must be repaired, respectively.

Durability is based on the time that a player spends in game, whereas time-limit is based on the length of time after an item is purchased, regardless of whether or not a player actively plays the game. The rate at which durability of items is lost is dependent on the price of the item, with cheaper items losing durability at a slower rate than more expensive items. For all items, the time-limit is 7 or 30 days, depending on the item. Durability of items can be restored by using repair points, which can be purchased with credits. Repair points are the only items in the game that do not have durability or a time-limit, and the player keeps the repair points until they are used.

Mechanaught performance is based on multiple factors that attribute to its stats. Heavy-class mechs often have more HP, EN, and SP—stats, improving its resilience in battle, but tend to be slower and easier to hit. Light-class mechs are the opposite, favoring speed and agility. Standard-class lingers in the middle. Parts from each class can be mixed and matched when building a Mechanaught. Weapons contribute less to your overall stats but carry stats of their own, regarding their performance. Some weapons are held with two hands, others can be mounted in each hand. Any weapon will produce a given amount of heat when fired, ultimately overheating the weapon until a cooldown period has elapsed. At this point, a player may switch to a secondary set of weapons, or wait for the weapons to cool down to be used again.

Skills may be purchased to add another form of attack. With their own cooldown rate, skills may only be used when there is enough SP accrued in a given battle.

Combat and its objectives are determined by the game mode the player chooses. Points are scored based on number of kills, contrasted to number of deaths, number of Aerogates currently in possession, number of flags captured, or ability to defend base towers. The team with the highest point total, or with their towers still standing, wins.

 Modes of play 
Most matches center around specified markers in the battlefield map called "aerogates". These are points of occupation that must be defended against for a positive outcome. An invading player merely steps onto an aerogate, to begin a capture process which will take several seconds. (Multiple allied players standing on an aerogate will increase the rate of capture.)

Around most aerogates, there will also be a small number (usually 1-2) of healing pads'', which will restore the health points (HP) of a player's mechanaught. However, healing pads have both a limited time of use for the allied side, and need time to restore themselves before they can be used again. Enemy players can only utilize allied healing pads when they capture the associated aerogate first.

Player-vs-player games

Death Match 
This is a traditional Deathmatch, where each player must fight every other player. Healing pads are absent. Aerogates cannot be captured; however, they still act as spawn points.

Team Death Match 
Team Death Match is referred to as "TDM". TDM is similar to Deathmatch, the key difference to deathmatch is that players are sorted into two teams, red and blue. Whilst healing pads are still absent in TDM, players with rectifier units are capable of restoring the HP of their teammates.

Territory Control 
In game, Territory Control is shortened to "TC". TC requires greater strategy and skill than other game modes. As a result, players can get frustrated when novice players fail to stay in designated locations, leaving the aerogates unguarded, resulting in the loss of the aerogate to the other team. Gameplay in TC is reminiscent to Battlefield, where each team must capture aerogates in order to accumulate points. At the end of the round, the team with the most points wins. A team also wins if it captures the enemy's base.

Capture the Flag 
Players are split into two teams. Similar to Territory Control, but with the added objective of making it to the enemy team's home aerogate and stealing their flag. The winning team is decided by which side captures the opponent's flag most often, within the 10 minutes of game play. If both teams capture the same amount of flags, then the match ends in a draw. If a player holding a flag is destroyed, the flag is restored when an opponent runs or touches the flag that is standing on the ground; the exception is, an allied player can grab the stranded flag before this happens. It currently has the best credit pay, after last stand level 3.

Unlike Territory Control, the number of aerogates occupied does not determine the winning team. In other words, if a team's flag is taken, that team loses, even if they occupy the majority of aerogates.
 When a player captures an enemy flag, it appears on the back of their mechanaught for everyone to see, and will increase the EN drain of jumping and boosting, as well as cut their max EN in half. Speed is reduced by 10%.

The goal is to eliminate opponents on the way, while protecting the flag.

Capture the Flag is one of the most entertaining game modes to offer in the game Exteel.

Player-vs-computer games

Last Stand 
Also called "LS", players are lumped into one team (which can go up to 8), and they fight together to destroy large numbers of computer-controlled drone mechanaughts. The drones appear in 2 large groups, at one location near the allied aerogates. The allies' objective is to defend the aerogates against these assaults. If one aerogate is captured by the drones, the game will end early in a defeat. The resistance of the drones can be increased only according to the difficulty level set by the master of the room before a game is started. The higher the difficulty level is set (ranging from 1 to 3), the higher score there is with each drone kill for the player(s). The number of drones that spawn per wave is dependent upon the number of players in the match before the wave starts. Competitions take place throughout every week. These "weeklies" award credits to players who manage to accumulate the highest number of points. The credits are awarded at every regular server maintenance on Wednesdays at 10 A.M. CDT.
 An additional feature exists in Last Stand, which does not exist in all other game modes. Whereas in other modes, it is player-versus-player, and players have to depend on allied healing pads and allied Rectifiers to restore the HP level, in Last-Stand mode, it provides a unique full-restoration 'Healing Skill' option available to all players in the fifth Skill slot. Simply, when a player presses the "5" key on their keypad, their mechanaught will have its HP restored to full health, regardless of how much damage has been received. To prevent this feature from being consistently used to avoid damage altogether, the 'Healing Skill' takes one minute to renew itself, and is shown by remaining dark until it is ready to be used again. Unlike regular-combat Skills which must be purchased out-of-game in the Store menu, the 'Healing Skill' does not need to be purchased, and does not require SP to use. The only limit on its use is the cooldown activated after using it.

For both Territory Control and Capture the Flag, stationary drone mechanaughts with powerful long-range siege cannons or rockets will appear to automatically defend allied aerogates. If an aerogate is captured, the drones will need to be destroyed for allied drones to appear. Unlike the drones in Last Stand, however, these have better armor, requiring more hits for a single drone. If destroyed, a drone will automatically re-spawn after 30 seconds. If an aerogate is neutral (i.e. has not been fully captured), no guarding drones will appear.

End of life announcement 
On December 22, 2009, NCSoft terminated its license to Exteel SEA. In addition, IAM-Interactive had removed its forum and website contents, replacing them with an advisory to consume all coins within 30 days, despite Exteel game servers being offline at the time.  The primary reasons for shutting down were a lack of financial stable income and NCSoft losing a lawsuit that resulted in a loss of 28 million dollars.

The game and all of its international servers were permanently shutdown on September 1, 2010 at 10:00am CST.

References

External links 
 

2007 video games
NCSoft games
Third-person shooters
Unreal Engine games
Video games developed in South Korea
Windows games
Windows-only games
Products and services discontinued in 2010
Video games about mecha
Inactive multiplayer online games